Wiederau may refer to:

Wiederau (Pegau),  a small village in the Leipzig district of Saxony, part of the municipality of Pegau
Wiederau (Saxony), a small village in the Mittelsachsen district of Saxony, part of the municipality of Königshain-Wiederau
Wiederau (Uebigau-Wahrenbrück), a village in the Elbe-Elster district of Brandenburg, part of the municipality of Uebigau-Wahrenbrück

See also
Königshain-Wiederau, a municipality in the district of Mittelsachsen, Saxony, Germany